Testosterone phosphate (brand name Telipex Aquosum) is an androgen and anabolic steroid and a testosterone ester. Its structure is contained within polytestosterone phloretin phosphate.

References

Androgens and anabolic steroids
Androstanes
Phosphate esters
Testosterone esters